Mark Albert Fuller (born March 25, 1961 in Roseville, California) was an American competitor in Greco-Roman wrestling.

A member of the Sunkids Kids Wrestling Club he would have competed in the 1980 Summer Olympics but was prevented by the United States boycott of the event.  He came in second in the 1983 Pan American Games competition.

Personal life
Fuller is a Latter-day Saint.

Sources

2009 Deseret Morning News Church Almanac (Salt Lake City, Utah: Deseret Morning News, 2008) p. 326.

External links
 

1961 births
Living people
Wrestlers at the 1984 Summer Olympics
Wrestlers at the 1988 Summer Olympics
Wrestlers at the 1992 Summer Olympics
American male sport wrestlers
Olympic wrestlers of the United States
American Latter Day Saints
Sportspeople from Roseville, California
Pan American Games gold medalists for the United States
Pan American Games medalists in wrestling
Wrestlers at the 1991 Pan American Games
Medalists at the 1991 Pan American Games
20th-century American people
21st-century American people